The Michael Kelly Award is a journalism award sponsored by the Atlantic Media Company. It is given for "the fearless pursuit and expression of truth"; the prize is $25,000 for the winner and $3,000 for the runners-up. It is named for Michael Kelly, an American journalist killed covering the Iraq War.

In 2003 the University of New Hampshire, Department of English, established the Michael Kelly Memorial Scholarship Fund, which awards a sophomore or junior student "who is passionate about journalism".

References

External links
 The Michael Kelly Award

Awards established in 2004
Journalism awards